The Israelites were a group of Semitic-speaking tribes in the ancient Near East who, during the Iron Age, inhabited a part of Canaan.

The earliest recorded evidence of a people by the name of Israel appears in the Merneptah Stele of ancient Egypt, dated to about 1200 BCE. According to the modern archaeological account, the Israelites and their culture branched out of the Canaanite peoples and their cultures through the development of a distinct monolatristic—and later monotheistic—religion centred on the national god Yahweh. They spoke an archaic form of the Hebrew language, which was a regional variety of the Canaanite language, known today as Biblical Hebrew.

According to the Bible, the Israelites are the descendants of Jacob, who was later renamed Israel. Following a severe drought in Canaan, Jacob and his twelve sons fled to Egypt, where they eventually formed the Twelve Tribes of Israel. The Israelites were later led out of slavery in Egypt and subsequently brought back to Canaan by Moses; they eventually conquered Canaan under the leadership of Joshua. Most modern secular scholars agree that the Bible does not provide an authentic account of the Israelites' origins, and instead view it as constituting their national myth. However, it is accepted that this narrative does have a "historical core" to it.

A tribal period was followed by the rise of two Israelite kingdoms: Israel and Judah. The Bible portrays Israel and Judah as the successors of an earlier United Kingdom of Israel, although its historicity is disputed. The Kingdom of Israel, with its capital at Samaria, fell to the Neo-Assyrian Empire around 720 BCE; while the Kingdom of Judah, with its capital at Jerusalem, was destroyed by the Neo-Babylonian Empire in 586 BCE. Some of the Judean population was exiled to Babylon, but returned to Israel after Cyrus the Great conquered the region.

The Jews and the Samaritans are descendants of the ancient Israelites. Jews claim lineage from the Tribe of Judah and the Tribe of Benjamin, and partially from the Tribe of Levi since the ten northern tribes were considered lost following the Assyrian captivity. The Samaritans claim descent from the Tribe of Ephraim and the Tribe of Manasseh (two sons of Joseph) as well as from the Tribe of Levi. Other groups have also claimed affiliation with the Israelites throughout history.

Etymology

The name Israel first appears in non-biblical sources c. 1209 BCE, in an inscription of the Egyptian pharaoh Merneptah. The inscription is very brief and says simply: "Israel is laid waste and his seed is not". The inscription refers to a people, not to an individual or a nation state.

The name Israel first appears in the Hebrew Bible in Genesis 32:29 where it is given to Jacob by the angel with whom he has wrestled because he has "striven with God and with men, and ha[th] prevailed.". The folk etymology given in the text derives Israel from yisra, "to prevail over" or "to struggle with", and El (god). However, modern scholarship interprets El as the subject, "El rules/struggles", from sarar (שָׂרַר) 'to rule' (cognate with sar (שַׂר) 'ruler', Akkadian šarru 'ruler, king'), which is likely cognate with the similar root sara (שׂרה) "fought, strove, contended".

In the Hebrew Bible, the term Israelites is used interchangeably with the term Twelve Tribes of Israel. Although related, the terms "Hebrews", "Israelites", and "Jews" are not interchangeable in all instances. "Israelites" (B'nei Yisrael) refers to the people whom the Hebrew Bible describes specifically as the direct descendants of any of the sons of the patriarch Jacob (later called Israel), and his descendants as a people are also collectively called "Israel", including converts to their faith in worship of the national god of Israel, Yahweh. "Hebrews" (ʿIvrim), on the contrary, is used to denote the Israelites' immediate forebears who dwelt in the land of Canaan, the Israelites themselves, and the Israelites' ancient and modern descendants (including Jews and Samaritans). "Jews" (Yehudim) is used to denote the descendants of the Israelites who coalesced when the Tribe of Judah absorbed the remnants of the northern Israelite tribes.

During the period of the divided monarchy, "Israelites" was only used to refer to the inhabitants of the northern Kingdom of Israel, and it is only extended to cover the people of the southern Kingdom of Judah in post-exilic usage.

In literature of the Second Temple period, the term "Israel" was used as a timeless designation of the ethnos or to members of the united monarchy, the northern kingdom, or eschatological Israel. The term "Jew" was frequently used to refer to members of the contemporary ethnos, but it may also refer to a geographically restricted subs-group or to the descendants of the southern kingdom of Judah.

Finally, in Judaism, the term "Israelite" is, broadly speaking, used to refer to a lay member of the Jewish ethnoreligious group, as opposed to the priestly orders of Kohanim and Levites. In texts of Jewish law such as the Mishnah and Gemara, the term יהודי (Yehudi), meaning Jew, is rarely used, and instead the ethnonym ישראלי (Yisraeli), or Israelite, is widely used to refer to Jews. Samaritans are not and never call themselves "Jews" יהודים (Yehudim), but commonly refer to themselves and to Jews collectively as Israelites, and they describe themselves as Israelite Samaritans.

Biblical narrative
The Israelite story begins with some of the culture heroes of the Jewish people, the patriarchs. The Torah traces the Israelites to the patriarch Jacob, grandson of Abraham, who was renamed Israel after a mysterious incident in which he wrestles all night with God or an angel. Jacob's twelve sons (in order of birth), Reuben, Simeon, Levi, Judah, Dan, Naphtali, Gad, Asher, Issachar, Zebulun, Joseph and Benjamin, become the ancestors of twelve tribes, with the exception of Joseph, whose two sons Manasseh and Ephraim, become tribal eponyms.

The mothers of Jacob's sons are:
 Leah: Reuben, Simeon, Levi, Judah, Issachar, Zebulun
 Rachel: Joseph (Ephraim and Manasseh), Benjamin
 Bilhah (Rachel's maid): Dan, Naphtali
 Zilpah (Leah's maid): Gad, Asher

Jacob and his sons are forced by famine to go down into Egypt, although Joseph was already there, as he had been sold into slavery while young. When they arrive they and their families are 70 in number, but within four generations they have increased to 600,000 men of fighting age, and the Pharaoh of Egypt, alarmed, first enslaves them and then orders the death of all male Hebrew children. A woman from the tribe of Levi hides her child, places him in a woven basket, and sends him down the Nile river. He is named Mosheh, or Moses, by the Egyptian woman who finds him. Being a Hebrew baby, they award a Hebrew woman the task of raising him, the mother of Moses volunteers, and the child and his mother are reunited.

At the age of forty Moses kills an Egyptian, after he sees him beating a Hebrew to death, and escapes as a fugitive into the Sinai desert, where he is taken in by the Midianites and marries Zipporah, the daughter of the Midianite priest Jethro. When he is eighty years old, Moses is tending a herd of sheep in solitude on Mount Sinai when he sees a desert shrub that is burning but is not consumed. The God of Israel calls to Moses from the fire and reveals his name, Yahweh, and tells Moses that he is being sent to Pharaoh to bring the people of Israel out of Egypt.

Yahweh tells Moses that if Pharaoh refuses to let the Hebrews go to say to Pharaoh "Thus says Yahweh: Israel is my son, my first-born and I have said to you: Let my son go, that he may serve me, and you have refused to let him go. Behold, I will slay your son, your first-born". Moses returns to Egypt and tells Pharaoh that he must let the Hebrew slaves go free. Pharaoh refuses and Yahweh strikes the Egyptians with a series of horrific plagues, wonders, and catastrophes, after which Pharaoh relents and banishes the Hebrews from Egypt. Moses leads the Israelites out of bondage toward the Red Sea, but Pharaoh changes his mind and arises to massacre the fleeing Hebrews. Pharaoh finds them by the sea shore and attempts to drive them into the ocean with his chariots and drown them.Yahweh causes the Red Sea to part and the Hebrews pass through on dry land into the Sinai. After the Israelites escape from the midst of the sea, Yahweh causes the ocean to close back in on the pursuing Egyptian army, drowning them. In the desert Yahweh feeds them with manna that accumulates on the ground with the morning dew. They are led by a column of cloud, which ignites at night and becomes a pillar of fire to illuminate the way, southward through the desert until they come to Mount Sinai. The twelve tribes of Israel encamp around the mountain, and on the third day Mount Sinai begins to smolder, then catches fire, and Yahweh speaks the Ten Commandments from the midst of the fire to all the Israelites, from the top of the mountain.

Moses ascends Mount Sinai and fasts for forty days while he writes down the Torah as Yahweh dictates, beginning with Bereshith and the creation of the universe and earth. He is shown the design of the Mishkan and the Ark of the Covenant, which Bezalel is given the task of building. Moses descends from the mountain forty days later with the Sefer Torah he wrote, and with two rectangular lapis lazuli tablets, into which Yahweh had carved the Ten Commandments. In his absence, Aaron has constructed an image of Yahweh, depicting him as a young golden calf, and has presented it to the Israelites, declaring "Behold O Israel, this is your god who brought you out of the land of Egypt". Moses smashes the two tablets and grinds the golden calf into dust, then throws the dust into a stream of water flowing out of Mount Sinai, and forces the Israelites to drink from it.

Moses ascends Mount Sinai for a second time and Yahweh passes before him and says: 'Yahweh, Yahweh, a god of compassion, and showing favor, slow to anger, and great in kindness and in truth, who shows kindness to the thousandth generation, forgiving wrongdoing and injustice and wickedness, but will by no means clear the guilty, causing the consequences of the parent's wrongdoing to befall their children, and their children's children, to the third and fourth generation' Moses then fasts for another forty days while Yahweh carves the Ten Commandments into the second set of stone tablets. After the tablets are completed, light emanates from the face of Moses for the rest of his life, causing him to wear a veil so he does not frighten people.

Moses descends Mount Sinai and the Israelites agree to be the chosen people of Yahweh and 
follow all the laws of the Torah. Moses prophesies if they forsake the Torah, Yahweh will exile them for the total number of years they did not observe the shmita. Bezael constructs the Ark of the Covenant and the Mishkan, where the presence of Yahweh dwells on earth in the Holy of Holies, above the Ark of the Covenant, which houses the Ten Commandments. Moses sends spies to scout out the Land of Canaan, and the Israelites are commanded to go up and conquer the land, but they refuse, due to their fear of warfare and violence. In response, Yahweh condemns the entire generation, including Moses, who is condemned for striking the rock at Meribah, to exile and death in the Sinai desert.

Before Moses dies he gives a speech to the Israelites where he paraphrases a summary of the mizwoth given to them by Yahweh, and recites a prophetic song called the Ha'azinu. Moses prophesies that if the Israelites disobey the Torah, Yahweh will cause a global exile in addition to the minor one prophesied earlier at Mount Sinai, but at the end of days Yahweh will gather them back to Israel from among the nations when they turn back to the Torah with zeal. The events of the Israelite exodus and their sojourn in the Sinai are memorialized in the Jewish and Samaritan festivals of Passover and Sukkoth, and the giving of the Torah in the Jewish celebration of Shavuoth.
Forty years after the Exodus, following the death of the generation of Moses, a new generation, led by Joshua, enters Canaan and takes possession of the land in accordance with the promise made to Abraham by Yahweh. The land is allocated to the tribes by lottery. Eventually, the Israelites ask for a king, and Yahweh gives them Saul. David, the youngest (divinely favored) son of Jesse of Bethlehem would succeed Saul. Under David, the Israelites establish the united monarchy, and under David's son Solomon they construct the First Temple in Jerusalem, using the 400-year-old materials of the Tabernacle, where Yahweh continues to tabernacle himself among them. On the death of Solomon and reign of his son, Rehoboam, the kingdom is divided in two.

In the biblical narrative, the kings of the northern Kingdom of Israel are uniformly bad, permitting the worship of other gods and failing to enforce the worship of Yahweh alone, and so Yahweh eventually allows them to be conquered and dispersed among the peoples of the earth; and strangers rule over their remnant in the northern land. In Judah some kings are good and enforce the worship of Yahweh alone, but many are bad and permit other gods, even in the Holy Temple itself, and at length Yahweh allows Judah to fall to her enemies, the people taken into captivity in Babylon, the land left empty and desolate, and the Holy Temple itself destroyed.

Yet despite these events, Yahweh does not forget his people but sends Cyrus, king of Persia to deliver them from bondage. The Israelites are allowed to return to Judah and Benjamin, the Holy Temple is rebuilt, the priestly orders restored, and the service of sacrifice resumed. Through the offices of the sage Ezra, Israel is constituted as a holy nation, bound by the Torah and holding itself apart from all other peoples.

Historical Israelites
Efforts to confirm the Israelites' biblical origins through archaeology, once widespread, have been largely abandoned as unproductive, with many scholars viewing the stories as inspiring national myth narratives with little historical value. Scholars posit that a small group of people of Egyptian origin may have joined the early Israelites, and then contributed their own Egyptian Exodus story to all of Israel. William G. Dever cautiously identifies this group with the Tribe of Joseph, while Richard Elliott Friedman identifies it with the Tribe of Levi.

Based on the archaeological evidence, according to the modern archaeological account, the Israelites and their culture did not overtake the region by force, but instead branched out of the indigenous Canaanite peoples that long inhabited the Southern Levant, Syria, ancient Israel, and the Transjordan region through a gradual evolution of a distinct monolatristic (later monotheistic) religion centered on Yahweh. The outgrowth of Yahweh-centric monolatrism from Canaanite polytheism started with Yahwism, the belief in the existence of the many gods and goddesses of the Canaanite pantheon but with the consistent worship of only Yahweh. Along with a number of cultic practices, this gave rise to a separate Israelite ethnic group identity. The final transition of their Yahweh-based religion to monotheism and rejection of the existence of the other Canaanite gods set the Israelites apart from their fellow Canaanite brethren. The Israelites, however, continued to retain various cultural commonalities with other Canaanites, including use of one of the Canaanite dialects, Hebrew, which is today the only living descendant of that language group.

According to the religious narrative of the Hebrew Bible, the Israelites' origin is traced back to the biblical patriarchs and matriarchs Abraham and his wife Sarah, through their son Isaac and his wife Rebecca, and their son Jacob (who was later called Israel, whence they derive their name) with his wives Leah and Rachel and the handmaids Zilpa and Bilhah. Modern Jews and Samaritans can trace their ancestry to the Israelites. Modern Jews are named after and also descended from the southern Israelite Kingdom of Judah, particularly the tribes of Judah, Benjamin, Simeon and partially Levi. Many Israelites took refuge in the Kingdom of Judah following the collapse of the Kingdom of Israel.

Earliest appearance 

The name Israel first appears c. 1209 BCE, at the end of the Late Bronze Age and the very beginning of the period archaeologists and historians call Iron Age I, on the Merneptah Stele raised by the Egyptian Pharaoh Merneptah.
As distinct from the cities named (Ashkelon, Gezer, Yenoam) which are written with a toponymic marker, Israel is written hieroglyphically with a demonymic determinative indicating that the reference is to a human group, variously located in central Palestine or the highlands of Samaria.

Three Egyptologists have suggested that the name Israel appears in a topographical relief that either dates to the period of the Nineteenth Dynasty (perhaps during the reign of Ramesses II) or even earlier during the Eighteenth Dynasty. This reading remains controversial.

Origins

Several theories exist proposing the origins of the Israelites in raiding groups, infiltrating nomads or emerging from indigenous Canaanites driven from the wealthier urban areas by poverty to seek their fortunes in the highland. Various, ethnically distinct groups of itinerant nomads such as the Habiru and Shasu recorded in Egyptian texts as active in Edom and Canaan could have been related to the later Israelites, which does not exclude the possibility that the majority may have had their origins in Canaan proper. The name Yahweh, the god of the later Israelites, may indicate connections with the region of Mount Seir in Edom.

The prevailing academic opinion today is that the Israelites were a mixture of peoples predominantly indigenous to Canaan, although an Egyptian matrix of peoples may also have played a role in their ethnogenesis (giving birth to the saga of The Exodus), with an ethnic composition similar to that in Ammon, Edom and Moab, and including Habiru and Shasu. The Israelites as a group had both ethnic and religious elements. In the ancient Near East religion was tribal, and so was the religion of the Israelites; religion in this context was as much related to ethnicity as it was to spirituality. For the Israelites, Yahweh was their national god, with whom they believed they had a special covenant. The distinct ethnic identity of Israelites was strengthened by conflicts with other peoples such as the Philistines.

The origins of the god Yahweh are currently uncertain, since the early Israelites seemed to worship the Caanaanite god El as their national deity, only to later replace it with Yahweh. It has been speculated by some scholars that the cult of Yahweh may have been brought into Israel by a group of Caananite slaves fleeing from Egypt, who later merged with the Israelites.

Over the next two hundred years (the period of Iron Age I) the number of highland villages increased from 25 to over 300 and the settled population doubled to 40,000.

Monarchic period

United Monarchy 

According to the Hebrew Bible, the various tribes of Israel united in the 10th century BCE and formed the United Kingdom of Israel, under the leadership of Saul, who was later overthrown by David; after the death of David, his son Solomon ascended to the throne and reigned until his death, after which the Kingdom split into the Kingdom of Israel and the Kingdom of Judah.

The historicity of the United Monarchy is heavily debated among archaeologists and biblical scholars: biblical maximalists and centrists (Kenneth Kitchen, William G. Dever, Amihai Mazar, Baruch Halpern and others) believe that the biblical account can be considered as more or less accurate, biblical minimalists (Israel Finkelstein, Ze'ev Herzog, Thomas L. Thompson and others) believe that the Kingdoms of Israel and Judah developed as separate states and there was never a United Monarchy. The debate has not yet been resolved, although recent archaeological discoveries by Israeli archaeologists Eilat Mazar and Yosef Garfinkel seem to support the existence of a united monarchy. From 850 BCE onwards a series of inscriptions are evidence of a kingdom which its neighbors refer to as the "House of David."

Kingdoms of Israel and Judah 

Historians and archaeologists agree that a Kingdom of Israel existed by  900 BCE and that a Kingdom of Judah existed by  700 BCE. The political power of Judah was concentrated within the tribe of Judah, Israel was dominated by the tribe of Ephraim and the House of Joseph; the region of Galilee was associated with the tribe of Naphtali, the most eminent tribe of northern Israel.

The Kingdom of Israel was destroyed around 720 BCE, when it was conquered by the Neo-Assyrian Empire.

The Kingdom of Judah later became a client state of first the Neo-Assyrian Empire and then the Neo-Babylonian Empire. A revolt against the latter led to its destruction by King Nebuchadnezzar II in 586 BCE. According to the Hebrew Bible, Nebuchadnezzar destroyed Solomon's Temple and exiled the Jews to Babylon. The defeat was also recorded in the Babylonian Chronicles.

Later history 

Following the fall of Babylon to the Persian Achaemenid Empire under Cyrus the Great in 539 BCE, the Jews who had been deported in the aftermath of the Babylonian conquest of Judah were eventually allowed to return following a proclamation by the Persian king Cyrus the Great that was issued after the fall of Babylon to the Achaemenid Empire. The returned Jewish population in Judah were allowed to self-rule under Persian governance. Construction of the Second Temple was completed in 516 BCE, during the reign of Darius the Great, 70 years after the destruction of the First Temple.

Around the same era, the Samaritans emerged as an ethnic and religious community in the region of Samaria. With their temple on Mount Gerizim, they continued to thrive for centuries. Many Jewish authorities contest their lineage, deeming them to have been conquered foreigners who were settled in the Land of Israel by the Assyrians, as was the typical Assyrian policy to obliterate national identities. Most scholars believe the Samaritans are a blend of Israelites with other nationalities whom the Assyrians had resettled in the area.

The terms Jews and Samaritans largely replaced the title "Children of Israel" as the commonly used ethnonym for each respective community. The Greek term Ioudaios (Jew) was an exonym originally referring to members of the Tribe of Judah, and by extension the inhabitants of the Kingdom of Judah and the Judean region, and was later adopted as a self-designation by people in the Jewish diaspora who identified themselves as loyal to the God of Israel and the Temple in Jerusalem.  The Samaritans' ethnonym is derived either from Guardians/Keepers/Watchers [of the Law/Torah], or after the region of Samaria.

Genetics

A 2004 study (by Shen et al.) comparing Samaritans to several Jewish populations (including Ashkenazi Jews, Iraqi Jews, Libyan Jews, Moroccan Jews, and Yemenite Jews, as well as Israeli Druze and Palestinians) found that "the principal components analysis suggested a common ancestry of Samaritan and Jewish patrilineages. Most of the former may be traced back to a common ancestor in what is today identified as the paternally inherited Israelite high priesthood (Cohanim), with a common ancestor projected to the time of the Assyrian conquest of the kingdom of Israel."

See also
 Biblical archaeology
 Groups claiming affiliation with Israelites
 Lachish relief
 Masoretic Text
 Samaritan Pentateuch
 Tribal allotments of Israel
 Who is a Jew?
 Yom HaAliyah

Notes

References

Bibliography

 
 
 
 
 
 
 
 
 
  
 
 
 
 
 
 
 
 
 
 
 
 
 
 
 
 
 
 
 
 
 
 
 
 
 
 
 
 
 
 
 
 
 
 
 
 
 
 
 
 
 
 
 
 
 
 
 
 
 
 
 
 
 
 
 
 
 
 
 
 
 
 
 
 
 
 
 
 
 
 
 
 

 
Ancient Jewish history
Ancient peoples of the Near East
Ethnonyms
Land of Israel
Samaritan culture and history
Semitic-speaking peoples
Canaanite people